Gibberula simplex is a species of sea snail, a marine gastropod mollusk, in the family Cystiscidae.

References

simplex
Gastropods described in 1957